Nicholas Wall (6 August 1884 – 3 December 1939) was an Irish politician and farmer. He was first elected to Dáil Éireann at the 1923 general election as a Farmers' Party Teachta Dála (TD) for the Waterford constituency. He lost his seat at the June 1927 general election and was also an unsuccessful candidate at the September 1927 general election. He was elected as a National Centre Party TD at the 1933 general election. 

He became a Fine Gael TD on 8 September 1933 when Cumann na nGaedheal and the National Centre Party, along with the Army Comrades Association merged to form the new party of Fine Gael. He was elected as a Fine Gael TD at the  1937 general election but lost his seat at the 1938 general election.

References

1884 births
1939 deaths
Farmers' Party (Ireland) TDs
National Centre Party (Ireland) TDs
Fine Gael TDs
Members of the 4th Dáil
Members of the 8th Dáil
Members of the 9th Dáil
Politicians from County Waterford
Irish farmers